Gerrhopilus ceylonicus, also known as the Sri Lanka worm snake,  is a species of snake in the family Gerrhopilidae. It is endemic to Sri Lanka.

References

ceylonicus
Snakes of Asia
Reptiles of Sri Lanka
Endemic fauna of Sri Lanka
Reptiles described in 1943
Taxa named by Malcolm Arthur Smith